Alan Noel Sánchez Ordoñez (born 3 February 2004) is a Bolivian professional footballer who plays as a forward for Always Ready.

Club career
Born in San Lorenzo, Tarija, Sánchez played local football in Villamontes, before being picked up by Proyecto Bolivia 2022, a project created to encourage the development of young Bolivian footballers. He went on trial with Argentine side Gimnasia shortly before his fifteenth birthday, which he successfully passed.

He returned to Bolivia to sign for Real Tomayapo, being integrated into the first team in September 2021, having impressed with the reserves. He scored his first goal for the club in a 3–1 away loss to Oriente Petrolero on 27 November 2021.

International career
Sánchez represented Bolivia at the 2019 South American U-15 Championship, making four appearances.

Career statistics

Club

Notes

References

2004 births
Living people
People from Tarija Department
Bolivian footballers
Bolivia youth international footballers
Association football forwards
Club de Gimnasia y Esgrima La Plata footballers
Club Always Ready players
Bolivian expatriate footballers
Bolivian expatriate sportspeople in Argentina
Expatriate footballers in Argentina